Tara Snyder was the defending champion, but lost in the semifinals to Chanda Rubin.

Jennifer Capriati won the title, defeating Rubin 4–6, 6–1, 6–2 in the final.

Seeds

Draw

Finals

Top half

Bottom half

References
Main Draw and Qualifying Draw

Challenge Bell
Tournoi de Québec
Can